is a professional Japanese baseball player. He plays pitcher for the Chunichi Dragons.

External links

 NPB.com

1987 births
Living people
Japanese baseball players
Nippon Professional Baseball pitchers
Chunichi Dragons players
Baseball people from Nagoya